Royal Blood is the debut studio album by British rock duo Royal Blood. The album, produced by the band and Tom Dalgety, was released by Warner Bros. Records on 22 August 2014 in Friday-release countries and on 25 August 2014 in the United Kingdom.

The album was well received by music critics. It was nominated for the 2014 Mercury Prize for best album. It has been a commercial success, debuting at number one on the UK Albums Chart and being verified by the Official Charts Company as the fastest-selling British rock debut album in the UK in three years. It also charted worldwide, reaching top 10 positions in Ireland, Switzerland, Australia and New Zealand.

Background
Royal Blood was formed in 2013 by bassist and lead vocalist Mike Kerr and drummer Ben Thatcher. The pair had known each other since their teenage years and had been playing in various bands together and independently, with Kerr previously serving as a member of British rock band Hunting the Minotaur. With ideas for new songs and "a bass sound", Kerr formed the band with Thatcher after a nine-month tenure in Australia, meeting him at the airport and arranging rehearsals the next day and playing a concert to their friends in a local bar in Brighton.

After spending time in the recording studio, the band started to gain mainstream attention in the summer of 2013, when their songs, such as "Out of the Black" and "Come On Over", were first sent to the radio for airplay and after a promotional stunt where Matt Helders, the drummer of the Arctic Monkeys, wore a Royal Blood T-shirt during the band's performance at Glastonbury. Both bands share the same management company. The band was also additionally nominated by the BBC, along with fourteen other acts, for their Sound of 2014, however they lost out to British singer Sam Smith.

"Blood Hands" was featured prominently in The Divergent Series: Insurgent.

Composition
Most of the album's songs revolve heavily around the riffs written and played by bassist Mike Kerr.

Recording
The recording of the album was kept under strict conditions, with the band essentially recording the album with only Mike Kerr's vocals and bass guitar and Ben Thatcher's drum kit, with the exception of shakers and tambourines on some of the album's tracks. The production of the album did not involve the use of samples or overdubbing, which meant that most of the album's material was recorded in one take, thus producing a more natural sound as opposed to the popular method of recording various takes and combining them in the final mix.

Critical reception

Upon its release, Royal Blood was met with positive reviews from music critics. Positive consensus on the album was that it was well-produced and backed strongly by high quality songwriting both lyrically and musically. Criticism of the album was predominantly based around the lack of deviation sonically from the standard rock music formula. At Metacritic, which assigns a normalized rating out of 100 to reviews from mainstream critics, the album received an average score of 77, which indicates "generally favorable reviews", based on 15 reviews.

It was elected by Loudwire as the 5th best Rock album of 2014.

Ben Patashnik of British music magazine NME gave Royal Blood a largely positive review, describing the record as having "light, shade and careful nuance throughout" and stating that it was a "turbo-bastard of a rock record". Praising the album's composition and sound, he went on to write that while the album may not revolutionise rock music, the album has potential to extend the boundaries of rock music from its small share in mainstream media. He additionally stated, "Unconcerned with anything other than how fun the shared language of rock can be, Royal Blood is here to convince everyone in its path that loud is good". Stephen Ackroyd, the editor of British music magazine DIY, also gave the album a largely positive review, describing the album as not being "a cooler than thou indie band masquerading as something heavier", and stating that "Royal Blood can mix it". In contrast to Patashnik's review for NME, Ackroyd believes that the album would go on to bring rock music back to the forefront of mainstream media.

Chris Schulz of Auckland-based daily newspaper The New Zealand Herald commented on the effort put in by Kerr and Thatcher in sounding like a full band, describing the duo's sound as "a simple formula done with impressive clarity and at huge volumes" and that "it's a major surprise to discover that Royal Blood consists of just two people". He gave Royal Blood a positive four-star review, writing that "it's hard to pick favourites when every song is backed by riffs you'll want to air guitar along to until the final chords of "Better Strangers" ring out" and jokingly stating, "Someone better warn Jack White that these new kids on the rock block mean business". Harriet Gibsone of London-based daily national newspaper The Guardian gave the album a moderately positive three-star review. Comparing the album to early-2000s rock bands such as Death from Above 1979 and The Vines, while also comparing the album's guitar riffs to the sound of "Jack White drunk at a saloon bar", she wrote that "It's heavy and hefty enough to crown them kings of the commercial rock scene, but then, who is going to stand in their way?".

Kitty Empire of The Guardian sister newspaper The Observer gave a less positive review than her Guardian counterpart, also giving the album three stars. She made comparisons between Kerr's vocals and bass work to that of Jack White and Josh Homme, commenting that Kerr's channeling of Homme's vocals "actually sounds pretty great, not least because it's been a while since the Queens have made a record you could dance to". She closed her review with a moderately positive note, writing that, "Happily, their self-titled debut album sounds just like it should: a muscular expansion on the sound of their four preceding singles and EP. They're not a patch on their illustrious predecessors yet. Hell, they're not a patch on Deap Vally, but debt is a funny thing in rock. A great deal of it can be written off if the end result is a pleasure". Michael Palmer of music website The Line of Best Fit gave the album a mixed review, highlighting that "Royal Blood’s debut is an easily digestible, unfortunately thin-sounding, slightly disappointing rock record and an exciting, fresh, invigorating pop record both at the same time".

Jessica Goodman and Ryan Kistobak of The Huffington Post included the album on their list of 2014's best releases, saying that "it should be recognized as good for all parties".

The album artwork is by London-based contemporary artist Dan Hillier, from an original work titled 'Pachamama', the Quechuan word for Mother Earth. The artwork went on to win the award for 'Best Art Vinyl' in 2014.

"Ten Tonne Skeleton" was released as the album's latest single on 1 December 2014. This was released as a limited 7 inch limited edition vinyl with B-side "One Trick Pony". as well as being released to radio. "Ten Tonne Skeleton" was A-listed on BBC radio 1 and also went on to top the Kerrang! Radio Charts in January 2015 after 10 weeks on the chart.

Track listing

Personnel
Partly adapted from Out of the Black liner notes.

Royal Blood
Mike Kerr – lead vocals, bass guitar
Ben Thatcher – drums

Technical personnel
Tom Dalgety – production, mixing (tracks 1, 3, 5, 7, 10), recording
John Davis – mastering
Alan Moulder – mixing (track 2)
Dave Sardy – mixing (track 6)

Charts

Weekly charts

Year-end charts

Certifications

Release history

References

External links
 
 

2014 debut albums
Royal Blood (band) albums
Warner Records albums
Albums produced by Tom Dalgety
Albums recorded at Rockfield Studios